First-seeded Pauline Betz defeated fifth-seeded Doris Hart 11–9, 6–3 in the final to win the women's singles tennis title at the 1946 U.S. National Championships.

Seeds
The tournament used two lists of players for seeding the women's singles event; one for U.S. players and one for foreign players. Pauline Betz is the champion; others show in brackets the round in which they were eliminated.

  Pauline Betz (champion)
  Margaret Osborne (quarterfinals)
  Louise Brough (quarterfinals)
  Dorothy Bundy (first round)
  Doris Hart (finalist)
  Patricia Todd (semifinals)
  Shirley Fry (first round)
  Mary Arnold (semifinals)
  Jean Bostock (third round)
  Kay Stammers Menzies (third round)
  Raymonde Jones (first round)
  Mrs. Pat Adams (first round)
  Tara Deodhar (first round)

Draw

Final eight

References

1946
1946 in women's tennis
1946 in American women's sports
Women's Singles